Paul Raymond Bérenger GCSK, MP (born 26 March 1945) is a Mauritian politician who was Prime Minister of Mauritius from 2003 to 2005. He has been Leader of the Opposition on several occasions – from 1983 to 1987, 1997 to 2000, 2005 to 2006, 2007 to 2013, October 2013 to 15 September 2014, and again from December 2014 to December 2016 where he was replaced by Xavier-Luc Duval. Following his party's defeat in the 2014 general elections, he became Leader of the Opposition for the sixth time, making him the longest ever to serve in this constitutional position. He was also Deputy Prime Minister from 1995 to 1997 and again from 2000 to 2003, and he was a cabinet minister in the government of Anerood Jugnauth in 1982 and 1991. Bérenger, a Christian of Franco-Mauritian descent, has been the only non-Hindu Prime Minister of Mauritius, or, more particularly, the only Prime Minister who has not belonged to the Jugnauth or Ramgoolam families.

Early life, education & family
Bérenger was born to Mauritian parents whose ancestors arrived in Mauritius from France in the 1700s. Geneviève Bérenger, his mother, was the daughter of Auguste Esnouf, an engineer and author who used pen name Savinien Mérédac to write novels and newspaper articles. He completed his secondary schooling at the college du St Esprit in Quatre Bornes. He travelled to the UK to study French, attended the Sorbonne in Paris and graduated from the Bangor University with a BA Hons in philosophy and French. He later worked as a Trade Unionist from 1970 to 1982 and was elected to the Legislative Assembly for the first time in December 1976.

Political career 
Bérenger founded the Mauritian Militant Movement in 1969 along with Dev Virahsawmy and the Jeerooburkhan brothers. This party has always received more than 40% of direct votes in general elections.

1976 General Elections

Paul Bérenger was elected in Constituency No. 18 (Belle Rose and Quatre Bornes) at the December 1976 elections. The remaining 2 seats were secured by Independence Party (Labour-CAM) candidates James Burty david and Heeralall Bhugaloo. The general elections of 1976 turned out to be a three-way contest between the Independence Party (Labour-CAM coalition), the Parti Mauricien Social Démocrate (PMSD), and the MMM. There was a hung parliament, with 34 of the 70 seats in the National Assembly going to the MMM, 28 seats to the Labour Party, and 8 seats to the PMSD. Ramgoolam remained in office, however, by forging a coalition with the PMSD for a bare majority. Jugnauth was appointed Leader of the Opposition.

1982 General Elections

At the June 1982 general elections Paul Bérenger was elected in Constituency No. 18 (Belle Rose and Quatre Bornes) at the top of the list as a candidate of the MMM-PSM coalition. His running mates Kailash Ruhee and Devanand Routho secured the remaining seats in that constituency. The MMM won all 60 directly elected seats in the Legislative Assembly (except for two seats allocated to Rodrigues Island). Anerood Jugnauth became Prime Minister, Harish Boodhoo was appointed as Deputy Prime Minister. Bérenger became the Minister of Finance.

In early 1983, Bérenger proposed a constitutional amendment removing the executive powers of the Prime Minister and entrusting them to the Cabinet collectively. In this he was supported by Harish Boodhoo, but Jugnauth strongly objected. Bérenger then sought a parliamentary motion of no confidence to have Jugnauth replaced as Prime Minister by Prem Nababsing. Before the Legislative Assembly could vote on the matter, however, Jugnauth dissolved Parliament without any notice and called for new elections in August 1983.

1983 General Elections

At the August 1983 general elections Paul Bérenger stood as candidate of the MMM in Constituency No. 18 (Belle Rose and Quatre Bornes). But this time he was not elected whilst his rivals Michael Glover, Anil Gayan and Raj Virahsawmy of the MSM-Labour coalition were elected in that constituency.

1987 General Elections

Bérenger was once again candidate of the MMM in Constituency No. 18 (Belle Rose and Quatre Bornes) but he was not elected. His rivals of the MSM-Labour coalition (Michael Glover, Balkrishn Gokulsing and Raj Virahsawmy) were elected to the Legislative Assembly.

1991 General Elections

At the August 1987 general elections Bérenger was elected to the Legislative Assembly under the MSM-MMM coalition in Constituency No. 19 (Stanley and Rose Hill) behind his running mates Jayen Cuttaree and Jean Claude de L'Estrac.

On 18 August 1993, Jugnauth dismissed Bérenger and all Members of the MMM from the government and formed a new majority with the other parties.

1995 By Elections
In January 1995 Bérenger and Jean Claude de L'Estrac resigned from parliament, triggering by-elections in Constituency No.19. Bérenger was elected under the banner of the Labour-MMM coalition.

1995 General Elections
As a candidate of the Labour-MMM coalition Bérenger was elected in Constituency No. 19 (Stanley and Rose Hill) at the December 1995 elections, ahead of his running mates Siddick Chady and Jayen Cuttaree. This alliance won the 1995 elections with a 60-nil sweep of mainland Mauritian constituencies. Ramgoolam became Prime Minister with Bérenger as his Deputy. On 20 June 1997, however, Ramgoolam dismissed Bérenger and formed a new government without the MMM.

2000 Elections

In 1999, the national opinion polls showed that Prime Minister Navin Ramgoolam's Labour Party was the favorite to win the elections due in 2000. In an hour-long meeting organized by Bodhoo, Berenger made up his quarrel with Jugnauth and agreed to an electoral alliance and a power-sharing deal, should they win the election. The MSM and the MMM would each contest 30 of the 60 mainland seats. If successful, Jugnauth would serve as Prime Minister for three years; he would then resign, assume the (largely, but not entirely, ceremonial) office of President of Mauritius and make way for Bérenger to succeed him as Prime Minister, with Jugnauth's son Pravind Jugnauth as his Deputy.

The MSM/MMM alliance won 54 of the 60 seats. Jugnauth became Prime Minister again, appointing a 25-member Cabinet with Bérenger as Deputy Prime Minister.

The power-sharing agreement was briefly in doubt when, in 2001, Bérenger faced a charge of aiding and abetting a murder suspect to escape arrest. Swaleha Joomun, a widow, was suing the deputy premier for facilitating the escape of Bissessur who was wanted in connection with a triple murder which occurred on 26 October 1996 in Port Louis. Joomun's husband was a victim of the murder. Bérenger defended himself by saying that the reason he had helped Bissessur was because the latter wanted to reveal what he knew on the escadron de la mort (death squad). A second private prosecution was lodged against Bérenger by Raju Mohit (a member of the Movement Republicain) but in both cases, the Director of Public Prosecutions of Mauritius gave a Nolle Prosequi.

In 2003, Bérenger duly succeeded Jugnauth, who assumed the Presidency, as agreed.

Prime Minister

In 2003, Berenger took office as Prime Minister following the resignation of then Prime Minister Jugnauth after serving as his deputy for three years. He led the MSM/MMM coalition government for a period of one year and nine months before his alliance lost the elections to the Labour Party in 2005. He was the first and only non-Hindu Prime Minister.

Paul Berenger remained Deputy Prime Minister of Mauritius for three years and following the agreement, Anerood Jugnauth resigned in September 2003 after serving for three years.

Leader of the Opposition

Berenger subsequently tried to run on his own but lost the 2005 elections to Ramgoolam's Labour Party

Paul Berenger has been the leader of the opposition since 2007 after the MMM lost the general elections in 2005 to the Alliance Sociale coalition led by Dr Navin Ramgoolam. The MMM also lost the subsequent elections in 2010.

In January 2013, Berenger announced that he had tonsil cancer in a press conference - he let the population know of his plans for treatment in France and that Alan Ganoo was to lead the MMM during his absence. Overall he appeared in good spirits and was confident of a return to mainstream politics. Different sources relayed by the lexpress.mu website also announced the entry into politics of his son, Emmanuel Bérenger. Following his successful treatment for cancer, he returned to his position as Leader of the Opposition on 1 October 2013.

After his party ended its alliance with the Militant Socialist Movement (MSM), Berenger negotiated an alliance with the Labour Party on a power sharing deal whereby each party would nominate 30 candidates and, if successful in the election, would provide an equal number of Cabinet Ministers. Navin Ramgoolam would remain Prime Minister until a new constitution could be adopted to enhance the powers of the President, before resigning to make place for Bérenger to succeed him. This alliance lost the December 2014 elections, however, and Sir Aneerood Jugnauth, who had come out of retirement to lead L'alliance Lepep (Alliance of the People) was sworn in Prime Minister again, at the age of 84. In October 2019 Berenger went into the general elections with MMM not contracting any alliance with anyone. The MSM of Pravind Jugnauth won an overwhelming victory, although short of a three-quarter majority. Dr. Arvind Boolell of the labour party was appointed as leader of the opposition, as Navin Ramgoolam lost in his constituency. MMM managed to elect only nine MPs. Several petitions were lodged in the Supreme Court challenging the validity of the election results.

Controversies

1971 Azor Adelaide murder
In 1971 Bérenger narrowly escaped a murder attempt, whilst his assistant Azor Adelaide died soon after being shot by rival political activists on Chasteauneuf Street in Curepipe.

1978 Affaire Sheik Hossen
Following the building  fire at the head office of newspaper Le Mauricien on 11 June 1978, the MMM's propaganda paper Le Militant published a front-page article in which MMM activist Jean-Paul Sheik Hossen accused several members of the local intelligence police (Special Branch) to have planned the arson attack. Sheik Hossen made allegations against Special Branch's director Fulena, his deputy Sénèque, officers Jean-Paul Venkatachellum and Jean Ramiah. Security guard Yves Bedos supported Sheik Hossen's allegations. The Labour-PMSD-CAM government was alleged to be concerned by Le Mauricien'''s adoption of the new offset printing technology which would strengthen Bérenger's MMM.  Under cover of parliamentary immunity Bérenger further reiterated the accusations against the intelligence police, which led to a lengthy investigation and court appearances. Bérenger eventually has to publicly apologise for having blindly believed in Sheik Hossen's allegations.

1982 Microphone snatching incident
In 1982, although Anerood Jugnauth was his superior in the hierarchy of the MMM and short-term government, Paul Bérenger snatched the microphone off Jugnauth at a public appearance. This incident infuriated the witnesses from within the party as it confirmed Bérenger's lack of respect for others as well as his unpredictable nature.

1983 Coup d'État and Operation Lal Dora
In 1983 a military intervention in Mauritius by India, code named Operation Lal Dora, nearly occurred after the official leader of the new MMM-PSM government (PM Anerood Jugnauth) had alerted Indian PM Indira Gandhi of an imminent coup d'état, which would be led by his deputy prime minister Paul Bérenger.

2001 Illovo Deal for Franco-Mauritian companies
The 2001 Illovo Deal, which Bérenger labelled as mari deal (literally meaning "amazing deal") has been criticized to have favoured a small number of elite Franco-Mauritian capitalists, to the detriment of the rest of the Mauritian population, especially the small planters. Bérenger formed part of the government at the time of the Illovo Deal, and his adviser and broker Jean-Mée Desvaux negotiated with Anerood Jugnauth at the latter's office in order for the elite Franco-Mauritian conglomerate to pocket Rs 6 Billion whilst the State would only receive Rs 3 Billion of the deal involving the sale of more than 10,000 arpents of agricultural land. Prior to the Desvaux-Jugnauth meeting the Rs 6 Billion worth of land would have been acquired by the State (to be on sold and distributed to interested small planters).

2008 sexist insults towards women
As Leader of the Opposition Paul Bérenger showed disrespect towards women when he publicly insulted Nita Deerpalsing during a session of the National Assembly in August 2008. In response to MP Nita Deerpalsing's expression of support for then Attorney General Rama Valayden Bérenger commented rode ene mari pou li marié do!'' (meaning "go find her a husband so she can finally get married"). Paul Bérenger's loyal acolyte Rajesh Bhagwan defended Bérenger's insults on the basis that he had been upset by so much support for his opponent Rama Valayden.

Awards and decorations
:
 Grand Commander of the Order of the Star and Key of the Indian Ocean (2003)

References

1945 births
Living people
Prime Ministers of Mauritius
Foreign Ministers of Mauritius
Government ministers of Mauritius
Members of the National Assembly (Mauritius)
Mauritian people of French descent
Alumni of Bangor University
Deputy Prime Ministers of Mauritius
Mauritian Militant Movement politicians
Ministers of Finance of Mauritius
Grand Commanders of the Order of the Star and Key of the Indian Ocean
Leaders of the Opposition (Mauritius)
People from Plaines Wilhems District